Azizabad (also Romanized as ʿAzīzābād) is a village in Hasanabad Rural District, Fashapuyeh District, Ray County, Tehran Province, Iran. At the 2006 census, its population was 9, in 4 families.

References 

Populated places in Ray County, Iran